John Simon (born August 11, 1941) is an American music producer, composer, writer and performer. Recognized as one of the top record producers in the United States during the late 1960s and the 1970s, Simon produced numerous classic albums that continue to sell more than 50 years later, including the Band’s Music from Big Pink, The Band, and The Last Waltz, Cheap Thrills by Big Brother & the Holding Company featuring Janis Joplin, Songs of Leonard Cohen by Leonard Cohen, and Child Is Father to the Man by Blood, Sweat & Tears.

Background
Simon was born in Norwalk, Connecticut, United States; his father, a country doctor, taught him violin and piano at the age of four. He began writing songs before he was ten; by the time he graduated from high school Simon was already leading and writing for several bands, and had composed two original musicals. Simon enrolled at Princeton University where he wrote three more musicals and continued his role as a bandleader, taking a band to the finals of the 1st Georgetown Intercollegiate Jazz Festival.

Columbia Records
After Princeton, Simon was hired as a trainee at Columbia Records. He was first assigned to the Legacy department under the guidance of Goddard Lieberson, then the president of Columbia. Simon’s work during that period involved original cast albums of Broadway shows and audio documentary albums, including Point of Order, an LP of the notorious Senate hearings conducted by anti-Communist Senator Joseph McCarthy, and The Medium Is the Massage, inspired by the writings of media guru Marshall McLuhan. In 1966, he arranged and produced "Red Rubber Ball" by the Cyrkle. The song, which was co-written by Paul Simon (no relation) of Simon and Garfunkel and Bruce Woodley of the Seekers, went to No. 2 on the Billboard Hot 100 chart. It sold over one million copies and was awarded a gold disc. Around 1970 he also co-wrote "Davy's on the Road Again" with Robbie Robertson, subsequently a British Top 10 hit in 1978 for Manfred Mann's Earth Band.

With the success of "Red Rubber Ball", Simon was assigned other pop music artists like Frankie Yankovic, "America’s Polka King", and jazzman Charles Lloyd. The first production for which he also wrote extensive arrangements was Songs of Leonard Cohen, Leonard Cohen’s debut album. While assisting on what was to become the Simon and Garfunkel album Bookends, he met Al Kooper, who encouraged him to leave Columbia and become a freelance producer, which he did, producing Blood, Sweat & Tears’ first album, Child Is Father to the Man.

Independent
About that time, he was recommended to Peter Yarrow of Peter, Paul and Mary to help Yarrow with a movie he was making with cinematographer Barry Feinstein. The film was released in 1968 as You Are What You Eat and contained the song "My Name Is Jack", written by Simon for that movie, which later became a hit for Manfred Mann. Work on that film brought Simon to Woodstock, where he met manager Albert Grossman. Grossman asked him to produce several acts from his stable of talent, the first being Gordon Lightfoot. Once again, Simon sweetened the project with his orchestral arrangements (Did She Mention My Name). After that, he was asked to produce an album for Janis Joplin and her band Big Brother And The Holding Company (Cheap Thrills, which featured the hit single "Piece Of My Heart"). While producing an album for the Electric Flag, he met blues artist Taj Mahal, beginning a musical association which continues to the present. His name is often linked with the Band, with whom he was very closely associated, and he has been referred to as "the sixth member of the Band". The albums he produced with them in the 1970s, Music From Big Pink, The Band, and The Last Waltz, stand as precursors to the genre later labeled Americana. He was also the music director for the Last Waltz concert and contributed as a musician to Stage Fright and Islands and produced, played on, and cowrote for their 1990s comeback album Jericho. Other albums of note from that period were Morning Bugle by John Hartford, Jackrabbit Slim by Steve Forbert, Heart To Heart by David Sanborn, and Priestess by the jazz arranger Gil Evans. In addition he arranged as well as produced Mama Cass's Dream a Little Dream of Me album, Tiger In The Rain for Michael Franks, and Down Home by Seals and Crofts, as well as albums for Rachel Faro, Hirth Martinez, Cyrus Faryar and others. Once popular music sprouted disco and heavy metal, he lost interest in producing and only occasionally produced new recordings, including artists popular in Japan, including Motoharu Sano, often labeled "The Japanese Bruce Springsteen".

Other work

Simon composed the score for the controversial Frank Perry film, Last Summer (1969), starring Barbara Hershey and Richard Thomas. He played keyboards on the album Alone Together (1970) by Dave Mason, including the haunting piano on the song "Sad and Deep As You". In the Eighties, he wrote two ballet scores for the choreographer Twyla Tharp and composed circus music for aerialist Philip Petit (after his solo walk between the World Trade Towers). He was the music supervisor for a Broadway venture called Rock & Roll! The First 5,000 Years, modeled after Beatlemania, and produced the original cast album of The Best Little Whorehouse in Texas.

At one point, Paul Simon urged John Simon to follow his muse to be a singer-songwriter in his own right.  Consequently, in the early 1970s, he recorded two albums for Warner Brothers, John Simon's Album and Journey. Then, fifteen years later, saw the first of four albums for labels in Japan, the first of which, Out On The Street, was released in the U.S. by Vanguard.  Simon and his wife, C.C. Loveheart, wrote and performed a cabaret act called Alone Together For The First Time Again and, more recently, co-authored a popular play, Jackass Flats, which had its professional premiere in June 2011. A self-described "compulsive musician", Simon continues to be active. These days he performs his own material in concerts on rare occasions, but plays piano weekly with his jazz trio in his hometown near Woodstock, New York.
In 2018, Simon wrote a book, Truth, Lies & Hearsay: A Memoir Of A Musical Life In And Out Of Rock And Roll which received extensive favorable reviews as an accurate, yet personal rock history, combining first-person details of iconic recording sessions with lively, chatty wit.

Solo discography

References

External links
John Simon's website
John Simon bio. theband.hiof.no, a The Band website.

1941 births
American audio engineers
American blues pianists
American male pianists
American blues singers
American blues saxophonists
American male composers
20th-century American composers
American multi-instrumentalists
American record producers
American rock musicians
Living people
Musicians from Norwalk, Connecticut
Engineers from Connecticut
20th-century American pianists
21st-century American pianists
20th-century American male musicians
21st-century American male musicians